Simon Byrne  (born 29 April 1963) is a senior British police officer. He has served as Chief Constable of the Police Service of Northern Ireland (PSNI) since July 2019. He was the Deputy Chief Constable of Greater Manchester Police from 2009 to 2011 and the Assistant Commissioner for Territorial Policing in the Metropolitan Police Service from 2011 to 2014. He then served as Chief Constable of Cheshire Constabulary from 2014 to 2017.

Early life and education
Byrne was born on 29 April 1963 in Epsom, Surrey, England. He was educated at Neston High School, then a comprehensive school in Neston, Cheshire. He later studied police management at the University of Manchester, graduating with a Master of Arts (MA) degree.

Police career
Byrne began his career in the police when he joined the Metropolitan Police Service as a constable in 1982. He transferred to Merseyside Police in 1985. He served as the commander of the Metropolitan Borough of Knowsley between 2002 and 2004.

In 2006, he was promoted to Assistant Chief Constable. This is a chief officer rank therefore he joined the Association of Chief Police Officers. Within Merseyside Police he served as ACC Operations and ACC Personnel. In February 2009, he transferred to Greater Manchester Police, becoming Deputy Chief Constable. In 2011, he returned to the Metropolitan Police Service as the Assistant Commissioner for Territorial Policing.

On 24 February 2014, he was selected as the next Chief Constable of Cheshire Constabulary. He took up the appointment on 25 June. He was awarded the Queen's Police Medal (QPM) in the 2016 New Year Honours. On 23 August 2017, he was suspended after an investigation found he had a case to answer for gross misconduct. His fixed-term contract expired in 2018. He was cleared of misconduct on 11 December 2018.

Police Service of Northern Ireland
On 24 May 2019, Byrne was announced as the next Chief Constable of the Police Service of Northern Ireland (PSNI). He took up the appointment on 1 July 2019. He is paid £207,489 per year.

Honours

References

 

 
 

Living people
Chief Constables of Cheshire Constabulary
Chief Constables of the Police Service of Northern Ireland
Assistant Commissioners of Police of the Metropolis
1963 births
English recipients of the Queen's Police Medal
Police Service of Northern Ireland officers